The 2017 Women's Australian Hockey League was the 25th edition of women's field hockey tournament. The tournament was held in Perth, Western Australia between 28 September – 8 October.

In the 2017 edition, invitational teams from New Zealand and India competed in the tournament alongside the Australian states and territories.

VIC Vipers won the tournament for the third time, by defeating defending champions QLD Scorchers 2–1 in a penalty shoot-out, after the final finished a 2–2 draw. NSW Arrows won the bronze medal after defeating the NZL Development team 3–1 in the third and fourth playoff.

Competition format
Teams are split evenly into pools A and B where they compete in a single round-robin format.

At the conclusion of the initial pool stage, the top two teams in each pool progress to the medal playoffs in Pool C, while the remaining six teams progress to the classification matches in Pool D.

In Pool D, teams carry over points earned in previous matches and contest the teams they are yet to play. Final ranking in Pool D determines the final tournament standing from fifth to tenth place.

In Pool C, teams carry over points earned in previous matches and contest the teams they are yet to play. The top two teams then progress to the final, while the bottom two teams contest the third and fourth place playoff.

Participating teams

Results
All times are in AWST: (UTC+08:00)

First round

Pool A

Pool B

Second round

Fifth to tenth place classification

Pool D

First to fourth place classification

Pool C

Third and fourth place

Final

Awards

Statistics

Final standings

Goalscorers
7 Goals

 Emily Smith
 Emily Hurtz
 Penny Squibb

5 Goals

 Madison Fitzpatrick
 Madi Ratcliffe
 Kathryn Slattery

4 Goals

 Laura Gray
 Jessica Watterson
 Abigail Wilson
 Karri McMahon

3 Goals

 Kate Ivory
 Ashlea Fey
 Stephanie Kershaw
 Renee Taylor

2 Goals

 Jessica Smith
 Preeti Dubey
 Courtney Schonell
 Deanna Ritchie
 Karli Johansen
 Savannah Fitzpatrick
 Alison Penington
 Miki Spano
 Sarah Breen
 Georgia Nanscawen
 Roos Broek
 Katy Clarke
 Rachel Frusher
 Shanea Tonkin

1 Goal

 Meredith Bone
 Kalindi Commerford
 Ashleigh Deacon
 Samantha Economos
 Naomi Evans
 Gagandeep Kaur
 Sangita Kumari
 Suman Thoudam
 Jaime Hemmingway
 Kaitlin Nobbs
 Michaela Curtis
 Megan Hull
 Phoebe Steele
 Louisa Tuilotolava
 Brooke Capewell
 Taylor Collard
 Brooke Peris
 Kirstin Dwyer
 Rebecca Greiner
 Kazzia Lammon
 Britt Wilkinson
 Kim Blatchford
 Kate Holland-Smith
 Amy Hunt
 Euleena MacLachlan
 Hattie Shand
 Sarah McCambridge
 Lily Brazel
 Hannah Gravenall
 Nicola Hammond
 Aisling Utri

References

External links

2017
2017 in New Zealand women's sport
2017 in Indian women's sport
International women's field hockey competitions hosted by Australia
2017 in Australian women's field hockey